Moses Kimball (October 24, 1809 – February 21, 1895) was a US politician and showman. Kimball was a close associate of P. T. Barnum, and public-spirited citizen of Boston, Massachusetts.

Biography
Kimball was descended from Richard and Ursula Kimball, who came from England to Massachusetts in 1634 and were among the founders of the town of Ipswich, Massachusetts. Kimball was born in Ipswich to David and Nancy (Stacy) Kimball, and raised in Rockport, Massachusetts but moved to Boston at 15 to seek his fortune. He was ruined first in the "Eastern Land" speculation, and then again in 1833 in his purchase of the New England Galaxy, one of the earliest weekly newspapers of Boston, which was sold after a few months at a serious loss. Kimball married Frances L. A. Hathaway on June 25, 1834, and in 1836 started the New England Printing Company but it collapsed in 1837.

In 1838 Kimball purchased most of the New England Museum, added to it, made arrangements for a lease of the building on Tremont and Bromfield streets (later the site of the Horticultural Hall).

In 1840, Kimball travelled just twenty miles northwest to the new mill city, Lowell, MA and founded the Lowell Museum.

Then in 1841, Moses opened the Boston Museum.  The museum, rebuilt in 1846 and 1880, displayed a large number of stuffed birds and animals (later owned by the Boston Society of Natural History), several remains of Greek sculpture (now in the Museum of Fine Arts, Boston), and several historical portraits by John Singleton Copley. The Museum was immediately successful.

In the late spring of 1842, Kimball traveled to New York City to meet his rival, P. T. Barnum, in person. He brought with him a large oblong box containing a most unusual curiosity: an embalmed mermaid purchased at great price near Calcutta by a Boston sea captain in 1817.  If it wasn't a real mermaid, it was a remarkable fraud: the head of a baboon and the upper half of an orangutan  was attached to the lower half of a large fish.

On June 18, Barnum and Kimball entered into a written agreement to exploit this "curiosity supposed to be a mermaid." Kimball would remain the creature's sole owner and Barnum would lease it for $12.50 a week. Barnum christened his artifact "The Fejee Mermaid" and began to "puff" her to the skies.

By 1843, Kimball and P. T. Barnum were on the best of terms, and trading objects from their collections frequently. That same year they bought Charles Willson Peale's Museum in Philadelphia for $7,000 when it went out of business, and Barnum wrote to Kimball about the death of a prized live orangutan:

That same year, Kimball added a theater to his museum, although he called it a "lecture-room" in deference to the Puritan feeling in Boston. There he staged his own adaptations of Uncle Tom's Cabin among other productions.

Political life
As Kimball's fortune grew, he became an active public citizen. His first appearance in political life was in 1844, as a consequence of a speech by Daniel Webster, in which he urged the revision of the US naturalization laws in reaction to the Irish vote. As early as 1850, he offered a prize for the best essay on the treatment and prevention of croup. 

In 1849 and 1850 Kimball was elected as a member of the Common Council for Ward 10, he served as a city counciler in 1850 and 1851. In 1851 he was elected to the City Board of Aldermen serving as a member of the Board of Aldermen in 1852.

While never elected to the office, Kimball ran three times for Mayor of the City of Boston.
In 1858 he garnered 4,449 votes while losing to Frederic W. Lincoln, Jr. In 1860 Kimball ran as the Republican Party candidate, for Mayor of the city of Boston losing to Joseph Wightman. On that day, December 13, 1860, Kimball received 5,674 votes to Wightman's 8,834 votes. In 1868 he once again ran for Mayor, losing to Nathaniel Bradstreet Shurtleff, Sr. (Kimball received 9,156 votes to Shurtleff's 11,005 votes.)

Later years
Twenty years later, he established a prize for the best exhibit of shade trees set out in the streets of Rockport, Massachusetts, and for the best loaf of bread exhibited at the annual fair. Kimball made three journeys to Europe, in 1867, 1872 and 1877 to 1878. In 1879 Kimball donated to Boston a copy of Thomas Ball's sculpture Emancipation Group. Sited in Park Square it depicts an emancipated slave rising at the feet of Abraham Lincoln (Ball was a former employee of Kimball's.) In his will he left $5,000 for the Massachusetts Institute of Technology.

Death
Moses Kimball died in 1895, aged 85. In 1903 the famous Boston Museum was swept away.

See also
 1872 Massachusetts legislature
 1874 Massachusetts legislature
 1875 Massachusetts legislature
 1876 Massachusetts legislature

References

Bibliography
 A Manual for the Use of the General Court by Stephen Nye Gifford (1864) p. 204.
 A Manual for the Use of the General Court by Stephen Nye Gifford (1876) p. 332.
Acts and Resolves Passed by the General Court by the Secretary of the Commonwealth (1867) p. 859.
 Laura Keene v. Moses Kimball. Reports of cases argued and determined in the Supreme Judicial Court of the Commonwealth of Massachusetts. Nov. 1860. Google books
Memorial Biographies of the New England Historic Genealogical Society v. 9 (1890–97), Boston, MA: New England Historic Genealogical Society, 1908, p. 240.
 The New England Historical and Genealogical Register Vol XLIV. By Henry Fritz-Gilbert Waters (1895).
 Proceedings of the New England Historic Genealogical Society at the Annual Meeting, 7 February 1923  By New England Historic Genealogical Society (1923).

1809 births
1895 deaths
American entertainment industry businesspeople
19th-century American people
People from Ipswich, Massachusetts
Members of the Massachusetts House of Representatives
19th century in Boston
Boston Board of Aldermen members
Boston City Council members
Massachusetts Whigs
19th-century American politicians
Massachusetts Republicans
People from Rockport, Massachusetts
19th-century American businesspeople